Gleeson College is a Catholic secondary school in Golden Grove, South Australia. The college is named after the late Emeritus Archbishop of Adelaide, James William Gleeson and the motto "With one heart" derives from his serving for 10 years (1971–1981) on the Pontifical Council Cor Unum (that is "One Heart").

The campus comprises three secondary schools, Gleeson, Golden Grove High School (State) and Pedare Christian College (Anglican / Uniting Church) linked by a central common resource area. Year 11 and 12 students are able to study at the other schools. This campus was visited by Federal Labor Leader Kevin Rudd immediately after his announcement of the current Labor education policy of creating shared facilities at close-together state, Catholic, and/or independent schools. This policy may have been encouraged by the success of the Golden Grove Secondary Campus.

Rebuilding 

In 2004, considerable building work took place, enlarging the Thomas Library into the former administrator's office (which was moved to its current location as mentioned above), enlarging the multimedia room (which is now just an ordinary computer room), and adding a room used for lectures and presentations.

It was intended that from the Year 2000, Gleeson would be an 8-12 school that maintained an enrolment close to 650 students. As of 2006, the enrolment number is close to 700 students, a limit imposed by the Catholic Education Office, which limits the size of schools to prevent excessive competition between neighbouring Schools.

The college has three computer rooms in the school itself, as well as access to approximately seven rooms in Shared Facilities, and computers in all ordinary classrooms.

Notable alumni
 Carla Dziwoki (2000), Queensland Firebirds netball player
 Nadia Mapunda (2006), Adelaide Thunderbirds netball player
 Matthew Mullen (2006), Adelaide City football player
 Ryan McGowan (2007), Dundee United football player
 Daniel Mullen (2007), Newcastle United Jets football player
 Craig Goodwin (2009), Adelaide United football player
 Bradden Inman (2009), Crewe Alexandra football player
 Dylan McGowan (2009), Adelaide United football player
 Sean Roberts (2010), 2014 Commonwealth Games Representative Athletics 100m Sprint
 Jordan Elsey (2010), Adelaide United football player
 Jack Graham (2014) Richmond Football Club Australian rules football player
 Tahlia Borg (2020), Teenage Joans lead vocalist and drummer

References

Rock Eisteddfod Challenge participants
Private schools in South Australia
Special interest high schools in South Australia